"Brutal" (stylized in all lowercase) is a song recorded by American singer-songwriter Olivia Rodrigo. It was released to Italian radio through Geffen Records on September 3, 2021, as the fifth and final single from Rodrigo's debut album Sour. "Brutal" was written by Rodrigo and its producer Dan Nigro.

An alternative rock, grunge, and pop-punk tune, "Brutal" is driven by rock instrumentation consisting of brash electric guitars and drums. Its lyrics express Rodrigo's fear, worries and frustrations as a teenager entering adulthood. An accompanying music video to the song was released on August 23, 2021. It incorporates heavy visuals elements from the 1990s–2000s, especially the era's video games, while illustrating "teen angst". Commercially, the song reached the top 20 in various countries. In the United States, it landed at number 12 on the Billboard Hot 100, and topped the Hot Rock & Alternative Songs chart.

Composition

"Brutal" is one of eleven songs from Olivia Rodrigo's debut album Sour. The song resents the idea that one's teenage years are their best years and shares a sentiment of teenage frustration. It was written on a whim by Rodrigo and song's producer Dan Nigro. It has been described as a pop-punk, pop rock, alt-rock, and grunge song with elements of indie rock and punk.

"Brutal" features a guitar riff similar to that of Elvis Costello's 1978 song "Pump It Up", leading to accusations of plagiarism. Costello—who cited Bob Dylan's "Subterranean Homesick Blues" as inspiration for "Pump It Up"—replied to a tweet about the topic, "This is fine by me ... It's how rock and roll works. You take the broken pieces of another thrill and make a brand new toy. That's what I did."

Critical reception
Brutal received positive reviews from critics. Billboard Larisha Paul described "Brutal"'s opening as "shimmering" and "brilliant", and the rest of the song as "grungy rock". Jules Lefevre, writing for Junkee, described the song as "infinitely enjoyable", and described Rodrigo's vocals as "kiss-off". Rolling Stone Angie Martoccio likened Rodrigo in the song to "an excited teenager relaying gossip on a rotary phone". Olivia Horn of Pitchfork speculated on whether "Brutal" is "[b]ucking expectations about the kind of sounds [Rodrigo] might gravitate toward" and describes that as just "part of the fun". AllMusic reviewer  Heather Phares called "Brutal" "a surprisingly punky blast of angst", likening the guitars to "the musical equivalent of an eyeroll."

Entertainment Weekly called "Brutal" the best song of 2021, describing it as "like stepping through a Lollapalooza looking glass, the alt-nation swagger and blown-out guitar fuzz of the Breeders and Elastica reborn in one dimpled Gen-Z teen."

Commercial performance
Following the release of Sour, "Brutal" debuted at number 12 on the US Billboard Hot 100, and atop the Billboard Hot Rock & Alternative Songs chart.

Usage in media 
"Brutal" appeared in the opening montage of Hockey Night in Canada coverage of Game Two of the 2021 Stanley Cup Finals between the Montreal Canadiens and the Tampa Bay Lightning. The song also served as the soundtrack for the first trailer of Amazon Prime Video's I Know What You Did Last Summer and in the opening scene of the season one finale of HBO Max's Gossip Girl. "Brutal" was also heavily featured during episode 4 of HBO's Hard Knocks season which chronicled the training camp for the 2021 Dallas Cowboys season. The song also appeared in Netflix's Do Revenge, The Imperfects and The School for Good and Evil.

Music video
A music video for "Brutal" was released on August 23, 2021, directed by Canadian director Petra Collins. The video features cameo appearances from actors Lukas Gage and Nico Hiraga, as well as model Salem Mitchell. Rodrigo's hairstyles in the video were styled by Clayton Hawkins. The video depicts Rodrigo's "teenage angst", using various visual elements of 1990s-2000s pop culture.

It opens in a "glitchy, throwback dimension", where an array of Rodrigo avatars appear, each adorning a stylized wig and exaggerated personality; an 8-bit version of "Brutal" plays in the background. One of the costumes is a reference to Leeloo from the 1997 movie and 1998 video game The Fifth Element. It is a "choose-your-player" selection, channeling Adobe Flash web games of the early 2000s. The various attires Rodrigo adopts in the video include a slicked ballet bun, plaited pigtails with a newsboy cap, low-slung space twists reminiscent of Mandy Moore's "Candy" music video, and two partial pigtails with wavy brunette and burgundy hair. A cursor clicks on Rodrigo dressed in a pastel blue ballet outfit and a matching wig, before changing to a scene where she squirms on a ballet studio floor after breaking her ankle while trying to perform en pointe. It is followed by scenes such as anchoring an oddly vivacious morning news program with gossips (whose logo is the same as the 1990s logo for UK news program News at Ten), a dull high school classroom, crying on an Instagram livestream, a stressed-out pop star shooting a commercial, and being physically dragged through an abandoned Westfield Santa Anita by "two real friends", among others. Right after the line "I can't even parallel park", the music stops briefly and Rodrigo is stuck in the crowded mall parking lot with cars beeping and she mouthes the words "What the fuck". Near the end of the video, Rodrigo climbs to the top of a Cadillac while the lyric "and God, I don't even know where to start" plays. The video concludes with her standing on the car, with a set of ballet dancers perform en pointe, while surrounded by other cars loudly beeping.

As of March 2022, the song has 35 million views on YouTube.

Vogue described the video as a "visual treat" and a compendium of "Y2K beauty", incorporating various looks that marked the 1990s-2000s era, alongside "playfully brash rebellion". Vulture and Insider noted similarities to Rina Sawayama's music video for "XS" (2020).

Credits and personnel
Credits adapted from the liner notes of Sour.

Recording
 Recorded at Amusement Studios (Los Angeles)
 Mixed at SOTA Studios (Los Angeles)
 Mastered at Sterling Sound (New York City)

Personnel
 Olivia Rodrigo vocals, backing vocals, songwriting
 Dan Nigro backing vocals, songwriting, production, recording, acoustic guitar, drum programming, electric guitar, synthesizer
 Erick Serna bass, electric guitar
 Ryan Linvill additional drum programming, Wurlitzer
 Paul Cartwright viola, violin
 Randy Merrill mastering
 Mitch McCarthy mixing

Charts

Weekly charts

Year-end charts

Certifications

Release history

References

External links
 
 
 

2021 singles
2021 songs
American pop punk songs
Olivia Rodrigo songs
Song recordings produced by Dan Nigro
Songs written by Dan Nigro
Songs written by Olivia Rodrigo
Grunge songs
Songs about teenagers
American alternative rock songs